"De ä bar å åk" (Northern Swedish dialect for "You just go") is a song written by Bosse Carlgren and Billy Gezon, and used as a fight song for the Swedish alpine ski team, featuring Ingemar Stenmark, Stig Strand, Calle Briandt and Jan Green. It was released as a 1976  single together with "Vi åk bättre da för da" (Northern Swedish dialect for "We go better day for day").

The song title refers to "De ä bar å åk", a quotation credited to Swedish alpine skier Ingemar Stenmark when answering a  journalist's question in a radio interview when asked what he did to win.

The song charted at Svensktoppen for five weeks between 24 April-22 May 1976, where it peaked at 3rd.

The song also appears in the 2014 film The Anderssons Rock the Mountains.

Charts

References

Fight songs
1976 songs
Songs written by Bosse Carlgren
Swedish-language songs